The DeLong Agricultural Implements Warehouse, on Patterson St. in Lexington, Kentucky, was built in 1881.  It was listed on the National Register of Historic Places in 1980.

The structure was "basically sound" in 1980.

The warehouse is no longer in place.

References

Warehouses on the National Register of Historic Places
National Register of Historic Places in Lexington, Kentucky
Buildings and structures completed in 1881
Former buildings and structures in Kentucky
Demolished but still listed on the National Register of Historic Places
1881 establishments in Kentucky